Carnation etched ring virus (CERV) is a plant pathogenic virus of the family Caulimoviridae.

External links
ICTVdB - The Universal Virus Database: Carnation etched ring virus
Family Groups - The Baltimore Method

Viral plant pathogens and diseases
Caulimoviridae